Navarin was a late 100-gun Hercule-class ship of the line of the French Navy, transformed into a Sail and Steam ship.

Service history
Navarin was used as a troopship in the Crimean War before becoming a schoolship in 1862. In 1873, her engine was removed and she became a sailing transport for prisoners sent in deportation in New Caledonia.

She became a hulk in Brest in 1887 and was eventually broken up in 1908.

Notes, citations, and references

Notes

Citations

References

 100-guns ships of the line

Ships of the line of the French Navy
1854 ships
Hercule-class ships of the line
Victorian-era ships of the line